International Festival of Comics and Games is held annually in Łódź at the Lodz Culture Centre. It is the largest Polish and assumed to be one of the largest in Central and Eastern Europe comic con.

In the beginning, the festival was called All-Polish Convention of Comic Creators. The first one was held on 2 February 1991 in Kielce. All subsequent ones were held in Łódź. The name was changed to International Festival of Comics in 1999, during the tenth edition of the con. In 2008 the "and Games" was added to the name, as the con expanded also embraced the area of computer games.

The Festival's special guests included Grzegorz Rosiński, Simon Bisley, Akira Yamaoka, Brian Azzarello, Eduardo Risso, Stan Sakai, Marvano, Pat Mills, Clint Langley, Milo Manara, Jean Giraud, Tanino Liberatore, Zbigniew Kasprzak, Karel Saudek, Henryk Chmielewski, Tadeusz Baranowski, Janusz Christa, Bogusław Polch, Szarlota Pawel, Bohdan Butenko and Norm Breyfogle among many other international and local comic creators.

During the Festival, numerous panels and workshops are held, as well as meetings with the creators, publishers and other important figures from the comic field, including the cross with movies and literature fields.

It is also accompanied by the largest comic market throughout the year, where fans, collectors and both professional and small-press publishers sell their products and collectibles.

The contest 
Each year a comic contest is held, where a special jury, composed of comic professionals and publishers chooses the best short comic submitted for the contest. The comic professionals and fandom prizes are also nominated and awarded during the Festival.

External links 
Festival's Webpage
Videos from the Festival

Comics conventions